The Battlecruiser Squadron was a Royal Navy squadron of battlecruisers that saw service from 1919 to the early part of the Second World War. Its best-known constituent ship was HMS Hood, "The Mighty Hood", which was lost in the Battle of the Denmark Strait on 24 May 1941. Following the loss of HMS Repulse on 10 December 1941, Battlecruiser Squadron was disbanded. Its last surviving member, HMS Renown, survived World War II and was removed from service and scrapped in 1948.

Formation 
During the First World War, the Royal Navy had initially maintained three squadrons of battlecruisers, until losses at the Battle of Jutland had reduced the number of available battlecruisers sufficiently to warrant a reduction to two squadrons.  Following the War, battlecruiser numbers were again increased to three, with a fourth building.

HMS Hood then became the flagship of the Battlecruiser Squadron on 18 May 1920.

Special Service Squadron 
In 1923, HMS Hood and HMS Repulse, along with several smaller ships of the First Light Cruiser Squadron, formed part of the Special Service Squadron, under command of Vice-Admiral Sir Frederick Field. The Squadron departed Devonport on 27 November 1923 and returned on 29 September 1924 after travelling around the world.

Inter-War Period 
Hood was decommissioned for a major overhaul from May 1929 to May 1931. During this period, flagship duties were transferred to Renown, and Tiger was returned to active service, to maintain the three ship strength of the squadron.  Following her recommissioning, Hood again became flagship of the squadron, and remained the flagship until her loss on 24 May 1941. Tiger was decommissioned on 30 March 1931 and scrapped shortly after.

Dissolution 
HMS Hood was lost in action with the German battleship Bismarck at the Battle of Denmark Strait on 24 May 1941.  HMS Repulse was sunk by Japanese aircraft off Kuantan, Malaya on 10 December 1941. With the loss of the Hood and later the Repulse, the squadron ceased to exist.  HMS Renown survived the war and was scrapped in 1948.

Rear-Admiral/Vice-Admiral commanding 
Included:

References

External links

Battlecruiser squadrons of the Royal Navy
Military units and formations of the Royal Navy in World War II
Military units and formations established in 1919
Military units and formations disestablished in 1941